Bazas is a commune in the Gironde department in southwestern France.

Geography
Bazas stands on a narrow promontory above the Beuve valley 60 km/37 mi southeast of Bordeaux and 40 km/25 mi southwest of Marmande.

History
As Cossio, it was capital of the ancient tribe of the Vasates, and under the Romans one of the twelve cities of Novempopulania, when it was known as Civitas Vasatica

In later times it was capital of the district of Bazadais, and was the seat of the bishop of the diocese of Bazas from at least the beginning of the 6th century until 1790. And for 250 years prior to 1057, the Bishop of Bazas bore the title of Bishop of Aire, Dax, Bayonne, Oloron and Lescar. According to Gregory of Tours, Bazas had a bishop at the time of the Vandal invasion in the 5th century.

The dedication of the cathedral to St. John the Baptist is explained in an account given by the same historian that a lady of Bazas, whom certain hagiographers of the 19th century believe to have been St. Veronica, brought from Palestine a relic of St. John the Baptist at the time of that saint's death.

Pope Urban II (1088–99) preached the crusade at Bazas.

Bazas was a subprefecture until 1926, when it lost this role to Langon.

Population

Sights
The town has a Gothic cathedral dating from the 13th to the 16th centuries, now part of the Unesco World Heritage Sites of the Routes of Santiago de Compostela in France. There are remains of ramparts (15th and 16th centuries) and several old houses of the 16th century. (Photo:)
Saturday morning markets are well worth seeing.
The area is also home to the Clementin Castles, built by Pope Clement V for himself and his family. You can visit around Bazas:
 Château de Roquetaillade
 Château de Villandraut
 Château de Fargues
 Château de Cazeneuve

Economy
The vineyards of the vicinity produce white wine. The town carries on tanning and trade in the well-known Bazadais cattle.

Transport
The N524 forms part of the Itinéraire à Grand Gabarit, a route which has been modified to allow its use by the oversize road convoys conveying body sections and wings of the Airbus A380 airliner, and several upgrades were made to the road through Bazas to this end.

See also
Ancient Diocese of Bazas
Communes of the Gironde department

References

External links

Roquetaillade castle
Town council website
Bazas Cathedral Setting and Zodiac Signs

Communes of Gironde
Gallia Aquitania
Gascony